Dmitri Shirshakov (born 14 November 1973 in Moscow) is a former Russian football player.

External links
 

1973 births
Footballers from Moscow
Living people
Russian footballers
PFC CSKA Moscow players
Russian Premier League players
FC Tyumen players
FC Saturn Ramenskoye players
FC Shinnik Yaroslavl players
FC Sokol Saratov players
FC Salyut Belgorod players
FC Luch Vladivostok players
Association football defenders